The 1981 Corrèze's 3rd constituency election took place on June 14, 1981.

Election results

See also 
 1981 French legislative election
 Corrèze's 3rd Constituency

References 

1981 elections in France